In meteorology, diurnal temperature variation is the variation between a high air temperature and a low temperature that occurs during the same day.

Temperature lag
Temperature lag is an important factor in diurnal temperature variation: peak daily temperature generally occurs after noon, as air keeps net absorbing heat even after noon, and similarly minimum daily temperature generally occurs substantially after midnight, indeed occurring during early morning in the hour around dawn, since heat is lost all night long. The analogous annual phenomenon is seasonal lag.

As the solar energy strikes the Earth's surface each morning, a shallow  layer of air directly above the ground is heated by conduction. Heat exchange between this shallow layer of warm air and the cooler air above is very inefficient. Incoming solar radiation exceeds outgoing heat energy for many hours after noon and equilibrium is usually reached from 3–5 p.m. but this may be affected by a variety of different things such as large bodies of water, soil type and cover, wind, cloud cover/water vapor, and moisture on the ground.

Differences in variation

Diurnal temperature variations are greatest very near Earth's surface. The Tibetan and Andean Plateaus present one of the largest differences in daily temperature on the planet.

High desert regions typically have the greatest diurnal-temperature variations, while low-lying humid areas typically have the least.

Both these extreme daily temperature changes were the result of sharp air-mass changes within a single day. The 1916 event was an extreme temperature drop, resulting from frigid Arctic air from Canada invading northern Montana, displacing a much warmer air mass. The 1972 event was a chinook event, where air from the Pacific Ocean overtopped mountain ranges to the west, and dramatically warmed in its descent into Montana, displacing frigid Arctic air and causing a drastic temperature rise.

In the absence of such extreme air-mass changes, diurnal temperature variations typically range from 10 or fewer degrees in humid, tropical areas, to 40-50 degrees in higher-elevation, arid to semi-arid areas, such as parts of the U.S. Western states' Intermountain Plateau areas, for example Elko, Nevada, Ashton, Idaho and Burns, Oregon. The higher the humidity is, the lower the diurnal temperature variation is.

In Europe, due to its more northern latitude and close proximity to large warm water bodies (such as the Mediterranean), differences in daily temperature are not as pronounced as in other continents. These include Southwestern Iberia (e.g. Alvega or Badajoz) or the high-altitude plateaus of Turkey (if part of Europe) (e.g. Kayseri).

Viticulture
Diurnal temperature variation is of particular importance in viticulture. Wine regions situated in areas of high altitude experience the most dramatic swing in temperature variation during the course of a day. In grapes, this variation has the effect of producing high acid and high sugar content as the grapes' exposure to sunlight increases the ripening qualities while the sudden drop in temperature at night preserves the balance of natural acids in the grape.

See also
Diurnal cycle

References

Meteorological phenomena
Daily events
Atmospheric temperature

fr:Amplitude thermique#Types